Stolař (Czech feminine: Stolařová) is a Czech language occupational surname which means joiner. Notable people with the surname include:

 Bernie Stolar, American businessman
 Václav Stolař (1893–1969), Czech gymnast

See also
 

Czech-language surnames